Between Shanghai and St. Pauli (German: Zwischen Schanghai und St. Pauli, Italian: I rinnegati di Capitan Kidd) is a 1962 West German-Italian crime adventure film directed by Roberto Bianchi Montero and Wolfgang Schleif and starring Karin Baal, Joachim Hansen and Horst Frank. It is also known by the alternative title Voyage to Danger.

The film's sets were designed by the art director Hans Berthel.

Plot 
Carlos, Blacky and Jochen sign up after a violent bar fight on a decrepit ship, the ramshackle freighter 'Trinidad'. It turns out that the ship with its expensive cargo is about to be blown up. An insurance fraud is aimed at by the unscrupulous criminal Frederic and his accomplice Diana. Everything changes after it turns out that the millionaire's daughter Vera Anden is also on the ship. Frederic is the secretary of her father, a rich businessman. Frederic then wants to extort a high ransom. But on the ship off the African coast, Jochen and his friends have taken command after a wild shootout. During a scuffle to capture Diana and Frederic, the crime boss is able to detonate an explosive device attached to the ship. The freighter sinks, but the three friends and Vera Anden can save themselves on land, where the rogue couple is taken away in handcuffs by the Moroccan police.

Cast
 Karin Baal as Vera 
 Joachim Hansen as Jochen 
 Horst Frank as Frederic 
 Carlo Giustini as Carlos 
 Ugo Sasso as Kapitän Brinkmann 
 Luisella Boni as Diana 
 Carmela Corren as Sängerin in der Bar 
 Mario del Marius as Quieto
 Dorothee Parker as Diana
 Bill Ramsey as Blacky

References

Bibliography 
 Bock, Hans-Michael & Bergfelder, Tim. The Concise CineGraph. Encyclopedia of German Cinema. Berghahn Books, 2009.

External links 
 

1962 films
1962 adventure films
1960s crime films
German adventure films
German crime films
West German films
1960s German-language films
Italian adventure films
Italian crime films
Seafaring films
Films directed by Roberto Bianchi Montero
Films directed by Wolfgang Schleif
Gloria Film films
1960s German films
1960s Italian films